Triacanthodes ethiops (Shortsnout spikefish) is a deep-water demersal fish found at a depth range 50 - 458 m.

References 

Tetraodontiformes